Dagaalty is a 2020 Indian Tamil-language action comedy film written and directed by Vijay Anand. The film stars Santhanam, Rittika Sen and Yogi Babu. It marks Santhanam and Yogi Babu’s second collaboration, after they previously appeared in an episode Lollu Sabha. It revolves around a trickster who turns good, a girl sought by a Samrat and how other characters' plans for winning the prize money (for bringing the girl to Samrat) go away. The film was released on 31 January 2020. This film marks Rittika's acting debut in Tamil film industry.

Plot 
Guru (Santhanam), a fraudster is assigned a task by Bhaiya (Radha Ravi) to find a person  (Rittika Sen) and bring her to Mumbai. He goes to Thiruchendur in search of that girl and eventually finds her. What happens next forms the crux of the story.

Cast 

 Santhanam as Guru
 Rittika Sen as Malli
 Radha Ravi as Bhaiya
 Yogi Babu as Dheena
 Tarun Arora as Vijay Samrat
 Brahmanandam as China Madhan
 Hemant Pandey as Robert
 Stunt Silva as Narasimha Reddy
 Namo Narayana as Malli's brother-in-law
 Santhana Bharathi as Malli's father
 Rekha as Malli's mother
 Manobala as Film director
 Saroja Ammal as Malli's grandmother
 Surender Thakur as Malik
 Telephone Raj as Tea master
 Scarlett Mellish Wilson in an item number

Production 
Principal photography began on 27 December 2018 in Chennai. Shooting wrapped up in September 2019. This is the biggest budget film in Actor Santhanam's career so far. Vijay Anand was an Associate of Director Shankar.

Soundtrack 
The soundtrack and background scores are all composed by Vijaynarain. Star Music India has acquired the audio rights.

Marketing 
The film's first look was released in June 2019. Teaser was released in 1 December 2019 after announcements in the film director's Twitter handle. The film was released on 31 January 2020.

References

External links 

 

2020s Tamil-language films
2020 films
Indian action comedy films
2020 action comedy films